Endon and Stanley is a civil parish in Staffordshire, England, containing the villages Endon and Stanley.

The civil parish (replacing a civil parish containing Endon, Stanley and Longsdon) was formed in 1894.

See also
Listed buildings in Endon and Stanley

References 

Villages in Staffordshire
Staffordshire Moorlands